Euler's quadrilateral theorem or Euler's law on quadrilaterals, named after Leonhard Euler (1707–1783), describes a relation between the sides of a convex quadrilateral and its diagonals. It is a generalisation of the parallelogram law which in turn can be seen as generalisation of the Pythagorean theorem. Because of the latter the restatement of the Pythagorean theorem in terms of quadrilaterals is occasionally called the Euler–Pythagoras theorem.

Theorem and special cases 

 
If the quadrilateral is a parallelogram, then the midpoints of the diagonals coincide so that the connecting line segment  has length 0. In addition the parallel sides are of equal length, hence Euler's theorem reduces to 

which is the parallelogram law.

If the quadrilateral is rectangle, then equation simplifies further since now the two diagonals are of equal length as well:

Dividing by 2 yields the Euler–Pythagoras theorem:

In other words, in the case of a rectangle the relation of the quadrilateral's sides and its diagonals is described by the Pythagorean theorem.

Alternative formulation and extensions 

Euler originally derived the theorem above as corollary from slightly different theorem that requires the introduction of an additional point, but provides more structural insight.

For a given convex quadrilateral  Euler introduced an additional point  such that  forms a parallelogram and then the following equality holds:

 being the midpoint of  yields . This yields  and hence .

Euler's theorem can be extended to a larger set of quadrilaterals, that includes crossed and nonplaner ones. It holds for so called generalized quadrilaterals, which simply consist of four arbitrary points in  connected by edges so that they form a cycle graph.

Notes

References 
Deanna Haunsperger, Stephen Kennedy: The Edge of the Universe: Celebrating Ten Years of Math Horizons. MAA, 2006, pp. 137–139
Lokenath Debnath: The Legacy of Leonhard Euler: A Tricentennial Tribute. World Scientific, 2010, pp. 105–107
C. Edward Sandifer: How Euler Did It. MAA, 2007, pp. 33–36
Geoffrey A. Kandall: Euler's Theorem for Generalized Quadrilaterals. The College Mathematics Journal, Vol. 33, No. 5 (Nov., 2002), pp. 403–404 (JSTOR)
Dietmar Herrmann: Die antike Mathematik: Eine Geschichte der griechischen Mathematik, ihrer Probleme und Lösungen. Springer, 2013, p. 418

External links 

 

Euclidean geometry
Theorems about quadrilaterals